Carex angustata is a species of sedge known by the common name widefruit sedge. It is native to the western United States from Washington and Idaho to California, where it grows in wet meadows and on streambanks.

Description
This sedge grows from a large rhizome network and does not form clumps as many other sedges do. The stems reach up to about a meter in maximum height with narrow, rough leaves. The inflorescence produces a few pistillate spikes and one or two staminate spikes, each a few centimeters long. The pistillate flowers have dark colored bracts. The fruit is covered in a sac called a perigynium which is 2 or 3 millimeters long, veined and bumpy, and generally green or pale brown in color, sometimes with red or purple spotting.

External links
Jepson Manual Treatment
USDA Plants Profile
Flora of North America
Photo gallery

angustata
Flora of California
Flora of Nevada
Flora of the Northwestern United States
Plants described in 1839
Flora without expected TNC conservation status